Operation Ramp was the name given to an Australian Defence Force (ADF) operation to support the evacuation of over 5,300 Australians and over 1,300 foreign nationals from the Lebanese ports of Beirut and Tyre during the 2006 Lebanon War. The evacuation was led by the Australian Department of Foreign Affairs and Trade (DFAT). The ADF deployed 22 personnel on 19 July 2006 to assist DFAT in a number of specialised roles, including support to the DFAT staff in Beirut, Cyprus and Turkey. A Task Force of 96 personnel was also deployed on 21 July 2006 that included:
a command element
two evacuee processing teams
liaison officers
movements officers
health specialists from various units including the 1st Health Support Battalion
linguists

ADF personnel were progressively withdrawn from Lebanon commencing on 3 August 2006 with all personnel home by 25 August 2006.

The Australian Federal Police (AFP) deployed both AFP and Victoria Police personnel on secondment to the AFP, who were performing peacekeeping duties in Cyprus. They entered Lebanon on ten occasions between 19 and 24 July coordinating the evacuation of the citizens. All the police members volunteered and did so whilst 'off duty'. Those members received an AFP Commissioner Citation for Hazardous Overseas Service.

See also
International reactions to the 2006 Lebanon War by evacuations and aid

References

Ramp